Famille et variations is a Canadian documentary film, directed by Mireille Dansereau and released in 1977. The film is a portrait of the changing social and political context of the nuclear family in the 1970s, focusing on four families of varying circumstances: a traditional nuclear family with a special needs child, a separated family, a single-parent family and a family in a communal living environment.

The film received a Canadian Film Award nomination for Best Feature Length Documentary at the 28th Canadian Film Awards in 1977.

References

External links
 

1977 films
1977 documentary films
Canadian documentary films
National Film Board of Canada documentaries
Films directed by Mireille Dansereau
French-language Canadian films
Documentary films about families
1970s Canadian films